Bernt Olufsen (born 11 February 1954), is a Norwegian newspaper editor.

He was born in Trondheim. He worked in Adresseavisen from 1975 to 1979, and was then employed in Verdens Gang (VG). After a period as subeditor he was promoted to editor in 1989, and was their editor-in-chief from 1994 to 2011. He was then hired as an editor in Schibsted.

He has also been a board member of the Norwegian Union of Journalists from 1983 to 1986 and the Association of Norwegian Editors from 1995 to 1999. From 2013 he has chaired Polaris Media.

References

1954 births
Living people
Norwegian newspaper editors
Verdens Gang people
People from Trondheim